Achaeus (flourished 3rd century BC) was a Greek Macedonian nobleman and was the second son born to King and founder of the Seleucid Empire Seleucus I Nicator and Sogdian noblewoman Apama I.

Background
Achaeus was of Greek and Sogdian descent. He had three siblings: one brother the Seleucid King Antiochus I Soter and two sisters: Apama and Laodice. Achaeus is sometimes called Achaeus the Elder, to distinguish him from his grandson the Seleucid General, Achaeus. He was a wealthy man and owned estates in Anatolia. Achaeus was a benefactor for those who assisted during the war against the Galatians. The Seleucid military campaign against the Galatians took place between 269-267 BC, during the reign of Antiochus I. Those who had assisted Antiochus I and Achaeus were taken prisoner and Achaeus paid for their ransom to be released. Antiochus I won this military campaign. Those who had Achaeus as their benefactor inscribed their benefaction on a stone stele and placed it in the sanctuary of Zeus at Babakome and that of Apollo at Kiddioukome. The descendants of those who were saved by Achaeus for all time were granted a seat of honor at the public festivals and sacrificed to Achaeus every year an ox in the sanctuary of Zeus. 

Achaeus married an unnamed Greek woman. From his wife, she had born him five children who were:
Antiochis, who married Attalus and became the mother of Attalus I, King of Pergamon.
Alexander, who held high positions under his paternal uncle Antiochus I Soter.
Laodice I, who was the first wife of the Seleucid King Antiochus II Theos.
Andromachus, he was held captive by the Egyptian Pharaoh Ptolemy III Euergetes.
 Laodice II, who married Seleucus II Callinicus (according to Polybius).

References

Sources
 Austin, M. M. 2006. The Hellenistic World from Alexander to the Roman Conquest: A Selection of Ancient Sources in Translation. Cambridge: Cambridge University Press.
 Grainger, J. D. 1997. A Seleukid Prosopography and Gazetteer. Leiden, New York and Köln: E. J. Brill.

External links
 Biographical information of Apama at Livius.org
 Biographical information of Laodice I at Livius.org 
 Article on Laodice no. 2 at Ancient Library
 Biographical information of Seleucus I Nicator at Livius.org

3rd-century BC Greek people
Seleucid dynasty
Ancient Orestians
Greek people of Iranian descent